Red Wings Airlines Flight 9268 was a Tupolev Tu-204-100 passenger jet that on 29 December 2012 crashed on landing at Moscow Vnukovo Airport, Russia, following a repositioning flight from Pardubice Airport, Czech Republic. There were no passengers on board, but 5 of the 8 crew members were killed when the aircraft hit a ditch and highway structures after overrunning the runway.

The accident marked the second hull-loss of a Tupolev Tu-204, as well as the type's first fatal accident since its introduction in 1989.

Background
According to Vnukovo airport authorities, there were eight crew members onboard and no passengers. 

The 29 December accident was the second runway overrun involving a Red Wings operated Tu-204-100B in nine days. A Moscow Vnukovo to Novosibirsk flight on 20 December 2012 (operated by a Tupolev Tu-204 registered as RA-64049) overran runway 25 at Tolmachevo Airport by  when its brakes failed on landing. All 70 people on board survived uninjured and damage to the aircraft was minor. As a result of that incident, on 24 December the Federal Air Transport Agency of Russia (Rosaviatsia) issued a mandatory Airworthiness Directive requiring Red Wings and all other operators of the Tu-204 to inspect and apply extra lubrication to the braking system drive mechanism limit switches, located on the main landing shock absorber, "before next departure".

On 28 December, the day before the fatal Vnukovo accident, Rosaviatsia also formally notified Tupolev, the aircraft's manufacturer, that malfunctioning brakes had caused the Red Wings Tu-204 overrun accident at Novosibirsk. On 30 December Rosaviatsia chief Alexander Neradko announced that a preliminary examination of the aircraft's flight data recorder indicated that the flight had touched down in the proper landing area but, as in the 20 December incident in Novosibirsk, the braking system on RA-64047 appeared to have failed in the fatal Moscow overrun accident as well.

Aircraft and crew 
The aircraft, a Tupolev Tu-204-100B (reg RA-64047, c/n 1450743164047, s/n 047) was built in 2008. The airframe had accumulated 8,672 flight hours in 2,482 cycles, while the captain, 58-year-old Gennady Dmitrievich Shmelev, had more than 14,500 hours of total flying experience, of which more than 3,000 hours were on the Tu-204. The first officer, 52-year-old Evgeny Ivanovich Astashenkov had more than 10,000 flight hours, including more than 500 hours on the Tu-204. The flight engineer, 54-year-old Igor Nikolaevich Fisenko, also had more than 10,000 flight hours, with nearly 1,600 of them on the Tu-204. The accident was the first hull loss for Red Wings Airlines since its founding in 1999.

Accident

The captain was in control of the aircraft during approach.

At the moment of touchdown only the left side gear was in contact with the runway. About 10 seconds have passed from the moment of passing the  altitude point and the touchdown.
Three seconds after touchdown nose gear strut was compressed. At this stage the right gear strut compression signal had not yet been sensed. Almost simultaneously with the touchdown of the nose landing gear, the crew put the engines into reverse and applied the mechanical brakes.

As a safety feature, both sets of main landing gear were required to be compressed simultaneously before the thrust reversers could deploy. Because there was no compression of the right landing gear, the reversers were never deployed, and moving the controls to the Maximum Reverse position caused an increase of forward thrust in both engines. In addition to the lack of reverse thrust, the airbrakes and spoilers failed to activate automatically, and the crew did not attempt to activate them manually. The increased speed, along with rolling of the aircraft from side to side, alternately compressed the left and right landing gear struts. The crew attempted to activate the reversers a second time, but because there was no time when both landing gear struts were compressed, the attempt was unsuccessful. The wheel brakes were also ineffective, as they also required compression of the gear strut to function correctly.

In the process of skidding off, at the command of the captain, the flight engineer switched off the engines by means of the emergency shut down. The plane continued to roll out of the runway, slowly decelerating due to road bumps and snow cover. At this point, both landing gear struts were compressed, which led to the activation of airbrakes and spoilers.

There were five fatalities. At 16:35 local time (12:35 GMT), the aircraft overran runway 19, splitting into three sections upon running into a ditch between the airport fence and the M3 highway, with parts of it scattering onto the road; included were parts of the aircraft's interior, seat assemblies and two of the aircraft's wheels hitting the underside of the runway's approach lighting system scaffolding and impacting an automobile. The crash was recorded on video by a dashcam mounted on another automobile. The cockpit section of the aircraft became detached from the rest of the airframe.

According to the official report, the cockpit crew consisting of the pilot, first officer, and flight engineer, were killed on impact. One of the flight attendants was ejected from the aircraft and landed on an adjacent road; she was confirmed to be dead in an ambulance transporting her to the hospital. Three of the remaining flight attendants, including the chief flight attendant, managed to escape the plane through cracks in the fuselage, and were transported to the hospital in serious condition. The remaining flight attendant was pulled out of the wreckage by first responders and transported to the hospital, where she later succumbed to her injuries.

See also
TAM Airlines Flight 3054

References

Further reading
Kaminski-Morrow, David. "Pilots killed as Red Wings Tu-204 crashes on Moscow highway." Flight International. 29 December 2012.
Kaminski-Morrow, David. "Crashed Tu-204 powered forward as pilots tried reversing thrust." Flight International. 24 January 2013.

External links
Ту-204 RA-64047 29.12.2012 - Interstate Aviation Committee (Official investigation)  (Archive)
Final report (Archive) 
EMERCOM of Russia
"In accordance with an order of Emergency Ministry's Head Vladimir Puchkov all necessary emergency response and recovery operations are continued ." 29 December 2012. Print , PDF , Word 
"Minister Vladimir Puchkov held an operational teleconference on the crash of Tu-204 airliner and gave instructions to all relevant services ." 29 December 2012. Print , PDF . Word 
Red Wings Airlines (Archive, Archive 2) 
 Airliners.net Flight 9268 preparing for departure in a photo by Karel Bohac, 29 December 2012
 

Aviation accidents and incidents in 2012
2012 disasters in Russia
Aviation accidents and incidents in Russia
Accidents and incidents involving the Tupolev Tu-204
2012 in Moscow
Transport disasters in Moscow
December 2012 events in Russia
Airliner accidents and incidents involving runway overruns